Acacia inops is a shrub belonging to the genus Acacia and the subgenus Phyllodineae that is endemic to south western Australia.

Description
It produces white-cream flowers from September to November. The simple inflorescences occur singly in the axils. The spherical flower-heads contain five to nine cream to white coloured flowers.

Taxonomy
The species was first formally described by the botanists Joseph Maiden and William Blakely in 1928 as part of the work Descriptions of fifty new species and six varieties of western and northern Australian Acacias, and notes on four other species as published in the Journal of the Royal Society of Western Australia. It was reclassified as Racosperma inops by Leslie Pedley in 2003 then transferred back to genus Acacia in 2006.

A. inops belongs to the Acacia horridula group along with Acacia hastulata and resembles Acacia uliginosa.

Distribution
It is native to an area in the South West region of Western Australia from around Busselton in the north down to Augusta in the south and is found in and around swamps and creek-lines growing in black peaty sandy soils. The bulk of the population is found around the Margaret River area

See also
List of Acacia species

References

inops
Acacias of Western Australia
Plants described in 1928
Taxa named by William Blakely
Taxa named by Joseph Maiden